Cosmic Cruiser is a game developed by Imagine Software and released for the BBC Micro, Commodore 64, Dragon 32, and ZX Spectrum in 1984. The object of the game is to fight off an alien raiding party that has taken over a distant space station and save the crew.

Gameplay
The player controls the astronaut, whose first objective is to navigate to the laser cannon and blast holes into the side of the space station through which he can enter. Once inside the space station the astronaut must locate and rescue any crew members, while avoiding hostile aliens.

Reception

While Home Computing Weekly praised the "excellent sound, colour and graphics" and described it as a "fast and addictive game," Crash criticised a number of its elements, summing it up as "unplayable and very soon completely pointless."

References

External links 

1984 video games
ZX Spectrum games
Commodore 64 games
BBC Micro and Acorn Electron games
Dragon 32 games
Video games developed in the United Kingdom
Video games scored by Fred Gray